Apache Country is a 1952 American Western film directed by George Archainbaud and written by Norman S. Hall. The film stars Gene Autry, Carolina Cotton, Harry Lauter, Mary Scott, Sydney Mason, Francis X. Bushman and Pat Buttram. The film was released on May 30, 1952, by Columbia Pictures.Filmed in black and white.

Plot

Cast
Gene Autry as Gene Autry
Carolina Cotton as Carolina Cotton
Harry Lauter as Dave Kilrain
Mary Scott as Laura Rayburn
Sydney Mason as Walter Rayburn
Francis X. Bushman as Commissioner Latham
Pat Buttram as Pat Buttram
Champion as Champ

References

External links
 

1952 films
American Western (genre) films
1952 Western (genre) films
Columbia Pictures films
Films directed by George Archainbaud
American black-and-white films
1950s English-language films
1950s American films